The first season of Broad City, an American television sitcom created by and starring Ilana Glazer and Abbi Jacobson, premiered on Comedy Central on January 22, 2014. The series was adapted from their independently-produced web series of the same name which ran from 2009 to 2011. It is produced by Lilly Burns and John Skidmore, with Jacobson and Glazer serving as executive producers, alongside Amy Poehler, Dave Becky, Tony Hernandez, and Samantha Saifer. The season consists of 10 episodes, with concluded on March 26, 2014.

Prior to the creation of the original web series, Glazer had been working on a project with a partner which received negative feedback. In frustration, she enlisted the help of Jacobson, and the two began development of their own web series which became a success, leading to the television series. The series is based on Glazer and Jacobson's real life friendship, and their attempt to "make it" in New York. 

Guest appearances include Amy Poehler, Janeane Garofalo, Rachel Dratch, Fred Armisen, Jordan Carlos, Matt Jones, Jason Mantzoukas, Michael J. Burg, Phoebe Robinson, Steven Ogg, Neil Casey, Will Janowitz, Phillip Chorba, Michelle Hurst, Seth Morris, Franchesca Ramsey, Terry Marks, and Amy Sedaris.

Cast and characters

Main
 Abbi Jacobson as Abbalah "Abbi" Abrams, a twenty-five-year-old woman from the Philadelphia Main Line.
 Ilana Glazer as Ilana Wexler, a twenty-two-year-old woman from Long Island.

Recurring
 Hannibal Buress as Lincoln Rice
 Arturo Castro as Jamie Castro
 John Gemberling as Matt Bevers 
 Paul W. Downs as Trey Pucker
 Chris Gethard as Todd 
 Stephen Schneider as Jeremy Santos

Episodes

Reception

Critical reception
The show has received critical acclaim. Review aggregation website Metacritic noted season 1 received "generally favorable reviews," giving it a score of 75 out of 100, based on reviews from 14 critics. Karen Valby from Entertainment Weekly described the show as a "deeply weird, weirdly sweet, and completely hilarious comedy." The Wall Street Journal referred to the show as "Sneak Attack Feminism." Critic Megan Angelo quotes Abbi Jacobson, main star of Comedy Central's Broad City: "If you watch one of our episodes, there’s not a big message, but if you watch all of them, I think, they’re empowering to women.” The A.V. Club critic Caroline Framke wrote that Broad City was "worth watching" despite its "well-trod premise," and that the series is "remarkably self-possessed, even in its first episode."

Season 1 of the show received a 96% "Certified Fresh" rating from Rotten Tomatoes, based on reviews from 23 critics, with the site's consensus stating, "From its talented producers to its clever writing and superb leads, Broad City boasts an uncommonly fine pedigree." The A.V. Club named Broad City the second best TV show of 2014 for its first season.

Accolades
 Nominated: Critics' Choice Television Award for Best Comedy Series — Broad City (2014)
 Nominated: Critics' Choice Television Award for Best Actress in a Comedy Series — Ilana Glazer (2014)

Home media
"Broad City: Season 1" was released on DVD via Paramount Home Media Distribution in the United States and Canada (Region 1) on December 2, 2014, and in Australia and New Zealand (Region 4) on November 4, 2015. The 2-disc set contains the original aspect ratio of 1.78:1 (16:9), English Dolby Digital 2.0, and English subtitles for the hard-of-hearing. The special features include outtakes and deleted scenes, video commentary on select episodes, photo gallery, and a map of Broad City drawn by Abbi, is included within the packaging. The season has yet to be released on Blu-ray.

Streaming  
The first season of Broad City is available for streaming in both SD and HD on Amazon Video, Hulu, ITunes, and Google Play. It is not available on Netflix, however, it is provided via Netflix DVD rental.

References

External links
 
 Broad City Season 1 on IMDb

2014 American television seasons